The 1960 Ivy League football season was the fifth season of college football play for the Ivy League and was part of the 1960 NCAA University Division football season. The season began on September 24, 1960, and ended on November 24, 1960. Ivy League teams were 10–6 against non-conference opponents and Yale won the conference championship.

Season overview

Schedule

Week 1

Week 2

Week 3

Week 4

Week 5

Week 6

Week 7

Week 8

Week 9

1961 NFL Draft

Two Ivy League players were drafted in the 1961 NFL draft, held in December 1960: Ben Balme and Mike Pyle.

References